"Crying Underwater" is a song by Australian singer Dami Im, released on 13 September 2019. The song marks the beginning of a new chapter in Im's career, as it was released independently. Im said of the release; "There is so much pressure in today's society to always look happy so we end up feeling like we're not allowed to talk about how we really feel, Just like you're crying underwater where no one can see you crying." Speaking to The Courier-Mail, Im said "It's a song I wrote about somebody I knew who seemed really happy and he took his own life."

Im performed the song live on Sunrise on 13 September and on Studio 10 on 19 September 2019.

Track listings
Digital download
"Crying Underwater" – 3:39

Digital download
"Crying Underwater" (Taekn remix) – 3:26

Charts

Release history

References

2019 songs
2019 singles
Dami Im songs
Songs about suicide
Songs written by Dami Im